A Pyecombe hook is a distinctive shepherd's crook crafted in the old forge at the village of Pyecombe in Sussex, England since the 19th century. The Pyecombe hook was perfectly balanced with a twist that allowed shepherds to easily catch the hind leg of a sheep without injuring the sheep.  Its use is described by Charles Mitchell: “the curve is made so that the shepherd can hook it around the sheep’s leg, slide it up, give it a slight twist, and the sheep is caught fast without being in the least hurt.”  It was often made out of old gun barrels.

Pyecombe village stands on an ancient drove road on the South Downs and has a long shepherding history.  The Pyecombe hook was very popular amongst shepherds in Sussex for about 200 years. A surviving Pyecombe hook is integrated into the Tapsel gate at the entrance to the Churchyard of Pyecombe church. It is illustrated on the Pyecombe village sign.  There is an example in the Sussex Archaeological Society's Museum at Lewes.

It was made in the first half of the 19th century by Mr Berry, the blacksmith, in the old forge, now a private house, just opposite the entrance to the church. It continued to be made there by his successor, Mr Charles Mitchell, who owned the forge from 1872 to 1946.  The church has a ceremonial Pyecombe hook made in 1946 by Mr Sean Black, the last blacksmith at the forge.

The hook is celebrated in song:-

References 

Farming tools
Livestock herding equipment
History of agriculture in England
English inventions
Mid Sussex District
19th century in Sussex